Dave or David Katz may refer to:

David Katz (author) (born 1965), American author and music journalist
David Katz (conductor) (1924–1987), American conductor
David Katz (psychologist) (1884–1953), German-Swedish psychologist, gestalt perception
David A. Katz (1933–2016), U.S. federal judge 
David L. Katz (born 1963), Yale University nutritionist
David S. Katz (born 1953), Israeli historian
Dave Katz (songwriter) (born 1961), producer and songwriter
David Katz (1993-2018), perpetrator of the Jacksonville Landing shooting

See also
David Karr, born David Katz (1918–1979), American journalist, businessman, and NKVD agent